Orchards is a suburb of Pretoria in Gauteng, South Africa. It is located north west of the Pretoria CBD, and central to the mainplace Akasia. It has a population of 7,778 (2011) with a population Density of 2,100/km² (1.43 sq mi).

References

Populated places in the City of Tshwane